Mohamed Hassad (born November 17, 1952) is a Moroccan engineer and politician, formerly serving as Minister of the Interior in the government of Abdelilah Benkirane. He later served as Minister of Education before being fired in 2017.

Biography 
Hassad was born in the Berber town of Tafraout in the Sous region on 17 November 1952. He moved to Paris to study engineering, graduating from the École Polytechnique in 1974 and from the École Nationale des Ponts et Chaussées in 1976.

He then held several prominent positions, notably in the field of equipment. Between 1993 and 1995 he served as Minister of Public Works, Vocational Training, and Professional Training in successive governments under Mohammed Karim Lamrani and Abdellatif Filali. On January 31, 1995, he was appointed CEO of Morocco's national airline Royal Air Maroc before being elected President of the International Air Transport Association in 1997.

On July 27, 2001, Hassad was appointed by King Mohammed VI as Wali of the Marrakech-Tensift-Al Haouz region. He was named Wali of the Tangier-Tetouan region and governor of the Tangier-Assilah Prefecture in June 2005.

Hassad was named President of the Supervisory Board of the Tanger-Med Special Agency in November 1992.

References 

1952 births
École Polytechnique alumni
École des Ponts ParisTech alumni
Government ministers of Morocco
Living people
Moroccan Muslims
Moroccan Berber politicians
Shilha people